The 1999 Skate Israel was the 5th edition of a senior-level international figure skating competition held in Metulla, Israel. It was held on December 7–11 at the Canada Centre. Skaters competed in the disciplines of men's singles, ladies' singles, pair skating, and ice dancing.

Results

Men

Ladies

Pairs

Ice dancing

 WD = Withdrawn

External links
 results
 Skate Israel at the Israel Ice Skating Federation

Skate Israel
Israel Skate 1999
Skate Israel 1999